Frank John Urson (March 21, 1887 – August 17, 1928) was an American silent film director and cinematographer from Chicago, Illinois. Originally a photographer, he moved on to cinematography and film directing for the Thanhouser Company in New Rochelle, New York. He is also credited with acting in one film, Her Gallant Knights, which starred William Garwood in 1913. Urson directed Changing Husbands. He is perhaps best known for his 1927 film Chicago, produced by Cecil B. DeMille.

Biography
He was born on March 21, 1887, in Chicago, Illinois. Urson died on  August 17, 1928, at age 41 from drowning in Indian Lake, Michigan.

Partial filmography

Stranded (1916, cinematographer)
Nina, the Flower Girl (1917, cinematographer)
You're Fired (1919, cinematographer)
The Valley of the Giants (1919, cinematographer)
Too Much Speed (1921)
The Hell Diggers (1921)
Exit the Vamp (1921)
 The Strangers' Banquet (1922)
Tillie (1922)
The Heart Specialist (1922)
South of Suva (1922)
 Her Man o' War (1926)
Almost Human (1927)
Chicago (1927)

References

External links
 
 

1887 births
1928 deaths
American film directors
American cinematographers
Artists from Chicago
Silent film directors
Thanhouser Company
Deaths by drowning in the United States
Accidental deaths in Michigan